The 1955 Volta a Catalunya was the 35th edition of the Volta a Catalunya cycle race and was held from 3 September to 11 September 1955. The race started in Sabadell and finished in Barcelona. The race was won by José Gómez del Moral.

General classification

References

1955
Volta
1955 in Spanish road cycling
September 1955 sports events in Europe